Nyctimystes humeralis, also known as green big-eyed tree frog, is a species of frog in the subfamily Pelodryadinae that is found in New Guinea. Its natural habitats are subtropical or tropical moist lowland forests, subtropical or tropical moist montane forests, and rivers.

References

humeralis
Amphibians of New Guinea
Amphibians described in 1912
Taxonomy articles created by Polbot